Lourdes University is a private Franciscan university in Sylvania, Ohio. Established in 1958, the university is sponsored by the Sisters of St. Francis of Sylvania.

History

In 1916 Mother Adelaide Sandusky traveled from Minnesota to Northwest Ohio to establish a province of the Rochester Franciscans that eventually became the Sisters of St. Francis of Sylvania. For nearly 50 years, she cultivated the Sylvania Franciscan community establishing ministries including the Catholic and Franciscan institution known today as Lourdes University.

Initially created as an extension campus of the College of St. Teresa (in Winona, Minnesota), Lourdes Junior College was founded in 1958 to educate the Sisters of St. Francis. In 1964, the liberal arts institution was accredited by the Higher Learning Commission (HLC) of the North Central Association of Colleges and Schools. As time passed and there were fewer candidates in formation, Lourdes began admitting lay students with women enrolling in 1969 and men in 1975.

Academics
As a Franciscan university, Lourdes students receive a liberal arts curriculum with application to the professional studies. Classified among "Master's Colleges & Universities: Small Programs", Lourdes offers baccalaureate degree programs in the College of Arts and Sciences, the College of Business and Leadership, the College of Nursing, and the College of Social Sciences. Students can also pursue several pre-professional programs or a graduate degree.

Campus
Lourdes University is located in the suburban city of Sylvania, Ohio.

Facilities

Residence Halls
Residential students choose from 1 and 2 bedroom apartment-style living spaces in separate residence buildings.

Appold Planetarium 

The Appold Planetarium features SciDome, a single projector fulldome video system powered by Starry Night that allows real-time 3D sky simulation, fulldome shows and multi-media presentations.

Library 
The Duns Scotus Library at Lourdes University is named after a 13th-century Franciscan scholar. It has a collection of over 60,000 volumes. Lourdes University is a member of the OPAL/OhioLINK, a consortium of universities sharing their library resources electronically.

Scholarships
Lourdes University has scholarships available for academics, band, chorale, esports, campus ministry and athletics. At Lourdes, 99% of students receive financial aid consisting of federal grant funds and institutional aid.

Athletics 

The Lourdes athletic teams are called the Gray Wolves. The university is a member of the National Association of Intercollegiate Athletics (NAIA), primarily competing in the Wolverine–Hoosier Athletic Conference (WHAC) for most of its sports since the 2011–12 academic year; while its men's wrestling team competes in the Sooner Athletic Conference (SAC). The Gray Wolves previously competed as an NAIA Independent within the Association of Independent Institutions (AII) during the 2010–11 school year (the same season when they joined the NAIA).

Lourdes competes in 25 intercollegiate varsity sports: Men's sports include baseball, basketball, bowling, cross country, golf, lacrosse, soccer, tennis, track & field, volleyball and wrestling; while women's sports include basketball, bowling, cross country, golf, lacrosse, soccer, softball, tennis, track & field, volleyball and wrestling; and co-ed sports include competitive cheer, competitive dance and eSports.

Colors 
The school competes under the colors of terra cotta and black.

Mascot 
The mascot is Gubi, named after the tale of St. Francis of Assisi, a Wolf and the town of Gubbio.

References

External links
 Official website
 Official athletics website

 
Franciscan universities and colleges
Catholic universities and colleges in Ohio
Buildings and structures in Lucas County, Ohio
Education in Lucas County, Ohio
Association of Catholic Colleges and Universities
Educational institutions established in 1958
Roman Catholic Diocese of Toledo
Nursing schools in Ohio
Business schools in Ohio
1958 establishments in Ohio